Elizabeth Amoaa (born 16 August 1983)  is a Ghanaian reproductive health advocate.

Early life and education 
Elizabeth Amoaa was born on 16 August 1983 in Accra, Ghana. She attended Most Holy Heart Preparatory School in Dansoman in Accra, Ghana. She later moved to France where she completed her secondary school at College le Segrais and college education at College Leonard De Vinci at Melun.

In 2003, she moved to London UK to pursue her higher education at London Metropolitan University and  University of Surrey where she gained her LLB, and LLM respectively

Career 
She founded the Speciallady Awareness in 2017 with the aim of educating young women about gynecological conditions. She has authored a book entitled The Unspoken Identity.They made donations to organizations, schools, and hospitals in Ghana two years after the Speciallady Awareness was established. she made donations to 37 Military Hospital in conjunction with the Speciallady Awareness and 3FM.

Humanitarian works 
During the partial lock-down in Ghana in April 2020, Elizabeth collaborated with renowned Ghanaian media personality Abeiku Santana to feed thousands of people in Accra. Elizabeth's charity Speciallady Awareness regularly carries out outreach projects and donates sanitary products to schools and communities in Ghana.

Personal life 
Elizabeth currently lives in Andover, Hampshire, in the United Kingdom with her husband and has one child.

Awards and nominations

References 

1983 births
Living people
Alumni of London Metropolitan University
Alumni of the University of Surrey
People from Accra